The Staffordshire Mercury was a weekly regional newspaper published in Staffordshire, England.

The publication was founded in 1824 by Thomas Allbut, with the Rev. Leonard Abington as its first editor. It was later renamed The Potteries Mercury at some point.

The paper became the North Staffordshire Mercury in March 1834 but returned to being named the Staffordshire Mercury in April 1845.  The paper probably folded in May 1848.

The Staffordshire Mercury's notable journalists include Edmund Rogers (1840s)

References
Historic newspapers of the UK

Publications established in 1824
Publications disestablished in 1848
Defunct newspapers published in the United Kingdom
Defunct weekly newspapers
1824 establishments in England